The Waikaretāheke River is a river of the Hawke's Bay region of New Zealand's North Island. It serves as the outflow of Lake Waikaremoana, flowing southeast from the lake's southeastern shore to reach the Waiau River 20 kilometres northwest of Wairoa. State Highway 38 follows the river's course for much of its length.

See also
List of rivers of New Zealand

References

Rivers of the Hawke's Bay Region
Rivers of New Zealand